Rugby sevens at the 2019 Pacific Games in Samoa was played from 12 to 13 July at the St Joseph's Sports Field. The venue was changed three days before the tournament due to muddy conditions at Apia Park.

Participating nations

Medal summary

Medal table

Results

See also
 Rugby sevens at the Pacific Games

References

 
Rugby sevens
2019
2019 rugby sevens competitions
2019 in Oceanian rugby union
International rugby union competitions hosted by Samoa